In enzymology, a DNA alpha-glucosyltransferase is an enzyme that catalyzes the chemical reaction in which an alpha-D-glucosyl residue is transferred from UDP-glucose to a hydroxymethylcytosine residue in DNA.

This enzyme belongs to the family of glycosyltransferases, specifically the hexosyltransferases.  The systematic name of this enzyme class is UDP-glucose:DNA alpha-D-glucosyltransferase. Other names in common use include uridine diphosphoglucose-deoxyribonucleate, alpha-glucosyltransferase, UDP-glucose-DNA alpha-glucosyltransferase, uridine diphosphoglucose-deoxyribonucleate, alpha-glucosyltransferase, T2-HMC-alpha-glucosyl transferase, T4-HMC-alpha-glucosyl transferase, and T6-HMC-alpha-glucosyl transferase.

Structural studies

References

 

EC 2.4.1
Enzymes of known structure